Resko  (formerly ) is a town in Łobez County, West Pomeranian Voivodeship, Poland, with 4,436 inhabitants (2004). It is located on the Rega River.

Climate
Resko has an oceanic climate  (Köppen climate classification: Cfb) using the  isotherm or a humid continental climate (Köppen climate classification: Dfb) using the  isotherm.

Notable residents
 Carl Sprengel (1787—1859) a German botanist
 Felicjan Sypniewski (1822—1877) a Polish naturalist, botanist and entomologist
 Friedrich Leo (1851—1914) a German classical philologist
 Ernst Eduard Taubert (1838—1934) a Pomeranian composer, music critic and music educator
 Mieczysław Młynarski (born 1956) a retired Polish professional basketball player and coach
 Bartosz Arłukowicz (born 1971) a Polish center-left politician and pediatrician

References

External links
 Official town website

Cities and towns in West Pomeranian Voivodeship
Łobez County